First-seeded Margaret Smith defeated fifth-seeded Billie Jean Moffitt 8–6, 7–5 in the final to win the women's singles tennis title at the 1965 U.S. National Championships.

Seeds
The seeded players are listed below. Margaret Smith is the champion; others show in brackets the round in which they were eliminated.

  Margaret Smith (champion)
  Maria Bueno (semifinals)
  Ann Jones (quarterfinals)
  Nancy Richey (semifinals)
  Billie Jean Moffitt (finalist)
  Françoise Dürr (quarterfinals)
  Carole Graebner (quarterfinals)
  Norma Baylon (quarterfinals)

Draw

Key
 Q = Qualifier
 WC = Wild card
 LL = Lucky loser
 r = Retired

Final eight

References

1965
1965 in women's tennis
1965 in American women's sports
Women's Singles